Inés María Mendoza Rivera de Muñoz Marín (January 10, 1908 in Naguabo, Puerto Rico – August 13, 1990 in San Juan), was a former First Lady of Puerto Rico, teacher, writer and socialite. She was the second wife of Governor Luis Munoz Marín. Inés Mendoza stood by the Spanish language, defying the new colonial authorities that wanted to replace it with English.

Biography
Mendoza was an accomplished student in her native Naguabo. She was accepted into the University of Puerto Rico and later to Columbia University in New York, where she graduated in 1931. She was married to painter Rafael Palacios from 1931 to 1935 and during this marriage they had two children: Carmen Palacios Mendoza and Rafael Palacios Mendoza.

She returned to Puerto Rico to begin her career as a teacher, writer and newspaper columnist. In 1935, she would meet Muñoz Marín during one of his campaign stops in Naguabo. Although he was married to American writer Muna Lee, Muñoz Marín would move in with her a few years afterwards. They were married on November 16, 1946, a day after his divorce from Muna Lee was finalized. Their marriage produced two daughters, Viviana Muñoz Mendoza and Victoria Muñoz Mendoza.

In 1948, Luis Muñoz Marín was elected Governor of Puerto Rico. Mendoza lived at "La Fortaleza", the Governor's mansion, for sixteen years. As First Lady, she showed interest in Puerto Rico's ecology and public education system. After her husband retired as governor in January 1965, she returned to private life.

Luis Muñoz Marín died on April 30, 1980. Doña Inés, as she was known to close friends and family, died a decade after his death on August 13, 1990. A few years after her death, Mendoza's daughter, Victoria, attempted an unsuccessful campaign as the candidate for the Popular Democratic Party candidate for the island's governorship. She was defeated by Pedro Rosselló, the candidate for the New Progressive Party. Had she been elected, she would have become the island's first female governor. That honor would later go to Sila María Calderón when she was elected as the island's first female governor in 2001.

The Inés Mendoza high school in Cabo Rojo, Puerto Rico, is named in her honor as well as the junior high school in San Juan's rural barrio of Caimito and an elementary school in Yauco. As a teacher, Inés Mendoza defied the U.S.A. imposition of English and ban on Spanish language in Puerto Rico, teaching in Spanish. Her defiance got such a strong popular support that the imposition of English was abolished, as reminded by former governor of Puerto Rico, Alejandro García Padilla. http://economia.elpais.com/economia/2014/06/13/actualidad/1402670785_164869.html

See also
List of Puerto Ricans

References

External links
   Official Biography from the Luis Muñoz Marín Foundation website

1908 births
1990 deaths
First Ladies and Gentlemen of Puerto Rico
Columbia University alumni
People from Naguabo, Puerto Rico
Puerto Rican people of Spanish descent
Puerto Rican Roman Catholics